Massalia may refer to:

 Massalia family, a family of asteroids
 20 Massalia, an asteroid
 Massalia, ancient name of Marseille
 MS Massalia, the original name of a car and passenger ferry renamed MS Scandinavian Star